The Ninety-First Arkansas General Assembly was the legislative body of the state of Arkansas in 2017 and 2018. In this General Assembly, the Arkansas Senate and Arkansas House of Representatives were both controlled by the Republicans. In the Senate, 23 senators were Republicans, 11 were Democrats, and one position was vacant until April. In the House, 69 representatives were Republicans, 30 were Democrats, and one was independent.

Sessions
The Regular Session of the 91st General Assembly opened on January 9, 2017. It adjourned sine die May 1, 2017, immediately followed the First Extraordinary Session.

Major events

Corruption and scandals
The 91st General Assembly was marked by several scandals, indictments, and guilty pleas involving current and former legislators. Two sitting legislators resigned following charges of fraud and other crimes. Former legislators Hank Wilkins IV, Jon Woods and Micah Neal plead guilty during the 91st General Assembly, detailing a fraud and kickback scheme abusing Arkansas's General Improvement Fund. Their pleas indicated sitting members in the 91st General Assembly could be charged later. 

Representative Mickey Gates (R-22nd) made national news for failing to pay taxes for 15 years, but resisted calls for his resignation.

Major legislation

Page not found! - Arkansas State Legislature
Page not found! - Arkansas State Legislature

Vacancies
 Senator Greg Standridge (R-16th) died November 16, 2017. He was replaced by Breanne Davis (R) via special election on May 22, 2018.
 Senator Eddie Joe Williams (R-29th) resigned November 15, 2017 to serve as President Donald Trump's (R) representative to the Southern States Energy Board. He was replaced by Ricky Hill (R) via special election on May 22, 2018. 
 Representative David Branscum (R-83rd) resigned November 17, 2017 to become Arkansas's rural development director for the U.S. Department of Agriculture. He was replaced by Donald Ragland (R) via special election on May 22, 2018. 
 Speaker Jeremy Gillam (R-45th) resigned June 15, 2018 to become director of governmental affairs and external relations at the University of Central Arkansas. Gillam's seat in the 45th District remained vacant, though Matthew Shepherd took over as speaker on June 15, 2018.
 Senator Jake Files (R-8th) resigned February 9, 2018, following a federal wire fraud, bank fraud, and money laundering guilty plea. He was replaced by Frank Glidewell (R) via special election on August 14, 2018.
 Senator Jeremy Hutchinson (R-33rd) resigned August 31, 2018, following a federal grand jury indictment of eight counts of wire fraud and four counts of filing false tax returns.

Senate

Leadership

Officers

Floor Leaders

Source: Arkansas Senate

Senators

House of Representatives

Leadership

Officers

Floor Leaders

Representatives

References

Arkansas legislative sessions
2017 in Arkansas
2018 in Arkansas
2017 U.S. legislative sessions
2018 U.S. legislative sessions